is a Japanese anime television series that was created, directed and written by Masaaki Yuasa, with Nobutake Itō in charge of character designs and Kei Wakakusa composing the music. The series was produced by Madhouse and aired on WOWOW from August 5 to November 5, 2006.

Plot
Since ancient times, there has existed a race of flesh eating monsters called , which could either assume a human-like form or otherwise live in the shadows while feeding on humans. The  martial arts style school was created to hunt down these mythical creatures and its teachings have been passed down through the generations to the Momota family. The fictional story revolves around the forbidden romance between Toshihiko, the latest heir of the Kifūuken school and Yuka, a young woman who is also a shokujinki.

Characters

Toshihiko Momota (桃田 俊彦, Momota Toshihiko) is a 30-year-old skilled, disciplined swordsman and the chosen heir of the Kifūken dojo. Throughout his life, he has been dedicated to the sword and inheriting the Kifūken dojo. 

In a twist of fate, he meets Yuka one night while she's skydiving. Though he tries to resist his feelings, he immediately falls in love with her, and the two begin a passionate relationship. Until his father's death, he had no idea that Yuka was a Shokujinki. 

When her real identity is discovered, he relinquishes his responsibility by running away with Yuka. Though the relationship faces several perils and hardships, Toshihiko truly loves her. One thing that contrasts their relationship to that of Harumi and Jūzō is his refusal to use Kemonozume in the final battle. 

Despite his injuries and losing his arm, he refuses to cut off Yuka's arm and fights against Ōba with all his strength and wits. At the end of the series, he and Yuka raise their daughter peacefully. Jin, Bon, and Saru are seen with the family, vacationing with the family together.

Yuka Kamitsuki (上月 由香, Kamitsuki Yuka) A 30-year-old Shokujinki who works as a skydiving instructor. She fell in love with Toshihiko as the two had fled from their past lives. Though both faced hardships in their relationship, Yuka truly loves and vows to protect him. 

Near the end of the series, she's revealed to be pregnant, but the paternity was never truly revealed. It is shown that before Toshihiko, she had an on/off again relationship with a fellow Shokujinki Gakuto. While Gakuto believes he's the father, Yuka believes it is Toshihiko's. Ultimately, she and Toshihiko raise the child free from their past lives along with Jin, Bon, and Saru as a family.

Kazuma Momota (桃田 一馬, Momota Kazuma) is the younger half-brother of Toshihiko. After his father's death, he assumes control of the Kifūken school. He aims to rid the world of Shokujinki with the help of a Mecha-like Buster Suit that he has personally developed. 

He has an attraction to Rie. Though her feelings are never entirely stated, she is attracted to him but is still fixated on Toshihiko. Near the end, she states she'll stay with him. After discovering the truth of his heritage, he kills one member staying in the Kifūken and comes close to killing another. 

He then goes in an attempt to kill Ōba. Only to fall into his trap and dies from his injuries after Ōba had his arms surgically removed. Given how long he's been able to live normally among humans, it is hinted that Ōba is the one that brought out his Shokujinki instincts. Most likely with a drug he used on Yuka once, his "medicine," then encouraged Kazuma to eat octopus and consume alcohol, which was hinted to trigger Shokujinki's monstrous instincts.

Rie Kakinoki (柿の木 利江, Kakinoki Rie) A female member of the Kifūken school where she has also been raised. Once, as a child, she was jokingly engaged to Toshihiko and was very much infatuated with him. Though many, including Jūzō himself, stated that Rie was wasting her time pinning for Toshihiko. 

Rie childishly believes the toy ring he gave her means a real engagement and isn't above dirty tactics to try and steal him away from Yuka. She even seduces him into an affair after an argument with Yuka. But he quickly regrets it and tries to tell her he doesn't want her. It is hinted after he leaves her and the group twice, she starts a relationship with his brother Kazuma. After Ōba takes over the Kifūken, she volunteers for an experiment and becomes attached to Kemonozume. 

He has her and Yuka drugged and forced to fight. While defeated, she's still alive until Kazuma finds her. Whether because of the drugs or because he had no control over his Shokujinki abilities, he loses his mind and devours her when he thinks she's died.

Kyūtarō Ōba (大葉 久太郎, Ōba Kyūtarō) A Kifūken swordsman who later took charge of the school's administrative tasks. He has an unassuming role at the beginning of the series but is later revealed to be the main antagonist. In the past, Ōba was shown to be an innocent and kind individual. 

But after seeing the carnage Jin did for power, it ultimately shattered him and changed him completely. His motives for what he's done are never clear. He stated he did what he did for his son, so he would be strong and not mocked by others. Another hint is that he did his cruel deeds to be stronger and keep power. One thing is known, he had an attraction to Harumi. An attraction he never acted on, but when he becomes corrupt. His attraction becomes a sick, twisted obsession. He kept her arms as his and cloned her body multiple times; in a sick attempt to make her his.

Bon Jōji Ōba Sometimes called "Bon" is a mysterious possibly albino giant sized man, who's a traveling detective. He also has a gift for making origami and gives them as gifts. He first appears in episode 3, apparently sent by Kazuma and the Kifūken to find Toshihiko. He would catch up to the couple in episode 6. Though he seems intimidating because of his height, he's very calm, gentle, and generous. When Yuka believes he's come to kill them, he calmly reveals that he did not come to cause her or Toshihiko harm, only to find them. 

He spends time developing a friendship with Yuka at her birthday dinner, and after befriending the couple, he decides to lie to his "employer" about their whereabouts. It is revealed that he's the illegitimate son of Kyūtarō Ōba and a prostitute, only known as "Nana" by her photo. He told Yuka in episode 6, that she died giving birth to him because of his size. He would reappear in episode 10 after Toshihiko loses a battle against Ōba and reveals he also has a Kemonozume; it is hinted his father forced him to take them. 

Ōba claims some of his cruelty is to make the world better for "Bon" because he doesn't want his son mocked or weak. However, Bon doesn't feel mocked or weak and doesn't want, what his father wants. He ultimately aids Toshihiko to save Yuka and stop his father; stating all he wants his friends. 

He, along with Jin, are one of the few characters to survive. He's seen in the epilogue, apparently vacationing with Jin, Yuka, Saru, and Toshihiko as a family. Now free from their pasts, he's enjoying his time with them. He's seen alongside Jin, as he took photos of Yuka and Toshihiko with their daughter.

  The leader of the Kifūken dojo. He is the father of Toshihiko and Kazuma. In his youth, it is revealed he, Ōba, and Jin were excelled trio students of the Kifūken. He and Jin had a friendly rivalry that lasted long into adulthood. At some point, he was married before though it is never said what happened to Toshihiko's mother; it is assumed she passed on. With his work, he left Toshihiko in the care of relatives. 

hings changed for them when he met and eventually fell in love with Harumi (Yuka's mother). So much that he lost his match on purpose with Jin, so he could become the leader of the Kifūken. This caused a big rift between the friends, as Jin wanted to fight him and win fairly. After Jin tried and became consumed by the Kemonozume, Jūzō was forced to ask Harumi for her arms so he could defeat him and stop his carnage. 

His will was apparently strong enough to keep his mind and defeat his former friend. But he later awoke and believed he had lost control and killed many students, along with Harumi. Wrapped with guilt of his apparent deeds, he has arms cut off and wears prosthetics. He was well respected by all the members and students of the Kifūken. And while he wanted Toshihiko to lead the Kifūken; he ultimately told his son to do what made him happy. 

He was killed by what he thought was his wife, Harumi. While it is believed a Shokujinki and placed the blame on Yuka, though there was no proof. When it is revealed at the end that Ōba had used his Kemonozume to take shapes, it is most likely he used his to take Harumi's form and killed Jūzō; himself.

  The past love/and second wife of Jūzō and mother of both Yuka and Kazuma. According to her, she left her kind because she didn't want to be like them. However, Yuka was told her mother fell in love with a human (Jūzō) and left everyone; including her own daughter. Only Jin and Ōba knew her secret and made a pact with Jūzō to hide her nature. 

She raised Toshihiko like her own child and for a time, the blended family was happy. Until Jūzō asked for her arms, to perform the Kemonozume to stop Jin. Though her arms were cut off, it is believed she still survived. Jūzō awoke though to find Jin gone, many Kifūken members, and Harumi dead. Both he and Toshihiko, believed he had lost control and killed his wife. It is later revealed that Ōba killed her and at some point killed the others, making Jūzō believe he committed the carnage. 

It is hinted that Ōba cut off Harumi's arms off Jūzō, so he could then use the Kemonozume. While Harumi was a dedicated mother to both her stepson and son; it is still never explained why she left her own daughter nor ever tried contact Yuka. It is possible she is the one who left her with her grandfather but it still never explains her abandonment of Yuka.

Shin Hoozuki  A Kifūken swordsman, he stands out for his afro-like hair and how he develops technological weapons for the Kifūken to defeat the Shokujinki. While he's friends with Toshihiko, he and another student Knife Tsutsuji are loyal followers to Kazuma when he takes over the Kifūken. Aside from Toshihiko, he's also the only member of the Kifūken to actually survive the end of the series. 

Many of his former members were either killed or turned into Shokujinki from Ōba's proclaimed "medicine" when they left Kazuma to work for Ōba. Knife was killed when Kazuma lost control of his Shokujinki abilities (though Hoozuki hints it could also be because Ōba also drugged him) and ate him. 

He also tried to kill Hoozuki but left him when Hoozuki revealed that Rie went to Ōba to have Kemonozume procedure done to her. He's last seen trying to help Toshihiko when he goes to battle Ōba. His whereabouts are unknown after Toshihiko defeats Ōba. It is believed he is alive but no longer part of the Kifūken, since many members were dead.

Gakuto Hoobari  Gakuto was a leader of a Shokujinki gang and was Yuka's on/and off again lover. He's seen in the first episode, fighting with her over the relationship with Toshihiko. He strongly believed she'd end up like Harumi and that he could only love her. Much to his anger, Yuka still rejected him. Her Shokujinki nature was found out at the funeral of Jūzō. When it appeared the other Kifūken members were ready to kill her, Gakuto came to her aid and fought off the members. 

This gave her and Toshihiko enough time to escape together. Though it is never stated, it is possible he hired Himeko try to find information in episode 5. He would reappear at the end of episode 7 and took Toshihiko hostage. In episode 8, he and his gang put him under psychological torture to get answers from him about the Kifūken. There he reveals that lately many Kifūken had been killing his kind, even children that had never ate human flesh. He's also suspicious about what they've been doing to the Shokujinki's arms since the new appearance of a "drug" that he accuses the Kifūken of making. Yuka allows Toshihiko's capture, most likely still feeling hurt by Toshihiko's tryst with Rie. Gakuto wastes no time, trying to win her back and reveals he knows about her pregnancy. He then tries to inquire about who the father is, but she never says. She firmly believes Toshihiko's the father. 

When the Kifūken attacks their hideout, Gakuto's group is able to get the upper hand on them. He then tells his group to retreat, and stays behind to by them and Yuka and Toshihiko time to escape. Before leaving, he tells Toshihiko of her pregnancy and inquires if he has a guess to the paternity. But the pair leave before he can answer Gatuko. Gatuko is last seen trying to fight against Ōba, he most likely died at his hands. Yuka reveals in episode 9, that Gakuto looked after her when she had no one left and it developed into a relationship. She states though that the relationship deteriorated when she felt that he was too bossy and he was trying to control her. It is revealed in episode 11, that Ōba did kill him and ultimately cut off his arms and gave them to Rie for the Kemonozume. Yuka is ultimately broken by the news of his death.

Jin Kakinoki Jin was a famous Kifūken swordsman, a rival to Jūzō Momota but eventually befriended him and Ōba. The three were considered the best team Kifūken and were supposed to duel as to who would be the leader of the Kifūken. Ōba forfeited, much to his and Jin's shock, Jin won when he fought Jūzō. He angrily accused him of losing on purpose. It was revealed Jūzō lost because he and Harumi had started a relationship which eventually had her pregnant. 

Though his reasons were understandable, Jin was extremely angry and felt cheated from the match he wanted for so long. He eventually married Akemi the daughter of a relative to their old master; and became a stepfather to Rie. However, he was very cold and uninterested in being a stepfather to Rie; much to his wife's dismay. Jin was still hellbent on becoming stronger than Jūzō and used an opportunity to use the Kemonozume when Ōba informs him of a village with Shokujinki. He drags Ōba to the village and demands he cut his arms, so he can use the Kemonozume. When Ōba refuses, Jin does it himself, this leaves Ōba mentally scarred watching him. 

Though Jin becomes consumed by the power, he unintentionally sets Ōba on his dark path, who sees that this is how the world's meant to be. This causes Ōba to believe that the best way to survive is to be stronger. Though it is believed Jūzō (who also used the Kemonozume) killed him, Bon reveals he's alive in episode 10. It is hinted that Ōba, most likely saved his former friend and kept him alive, to teach his son Bon, how to control his Kemonozume. 

Toshihiko meets him in episode 12, but Jin's a broken man from his past and possible living in hiding under Ōba's influence. He becomes very angry when sees Yuka's photo (because of her strong resemblance to Harumi) and starts angrily talking about how swordsmanship is a lie. Bon is able to calm him when he gives Toshihiko a child's book, that Rie use to ask him to read. It is while he is calmed by the book, it is hinted he regrets how he treated his family and Rie. He would appear in the last episode, taking the mask both Kazuma and Jūzō wore, and stumbles upon Harumi's clones. 

He eventually finds the group when they battle against Ōba. He tells Toshihiko he wants to believe in his dreams and tells Ōba he was wrong about believing it was best to be stronger. When Ōba refuses to surrender, Jin confronts him about his feelings for Harmi. It is shown he released Harumi's poorly made clones who attack Ōba, giving Toshihiko an advantage in the battle. Jin's seen piloting an airplane with his prosthetic hands, leaving the city with Bon, Yuka, and Toshihiko. He and Bon both give their approval that Toshihiko should remain with her. He's seen in the epilogue, years later vacationing with Bon and the couple. He's seen taking photos, much happier now and happily takes a photo of Yuka, Toshihko, and their daughter.

  A wily monkey with a liking for peaches. Toshihiko also has a tendency to call him "master" because he believes he possesses incredible skills as a fighter. His theory isn't entirely farfetched, as he has been able to defeat both Toshihiko and Kazuma during battle. He even once undid the screws that held Kazuma's sword together during an attack. He's seen at the end running into a female monkey, he mated with. Much to his surprise, he discovers his "mate" gave birth to their children.

List of episodes

Theme songs
Opening Theme: "Auvers Blue" by Katteni-Shiyagare
Ending Theme: "Suki" by Santara

References

External links
  Kemonozume Official Homepage
   WOWOW Official Homepage
 AniPages Daily per-episode commentary in English
 

Anime with original screenplays
Action anime and manga
Horror anime and manga
Madhouse (company)
Romance anime and manga